The Toronto Works and Emergency Services department was responsible for a variety of services.

The department took over public works departments formerly managed by the former cities in Metro Toronto, as well as waste management portion of Metro Toronto Works.

The division reported to a deputy city manager and with the new executive committee it will report to Glenn De Baeremaeker, chair of Public Works and Infrastructure committee.

Water

Toronto maintains a network of water filtration plants, pumping stations and reservoirs providing water to the city of Toronto. Some facilities are located outside the city, there are two reservoirs and one water tank located in York Region.

Sewage
In the past waste water was dumped into the lake and thus caused the waters off Toronto to become polluted. Since then the city has treated water from households and industry and commercial consumers before it returns to Lake Ontario.

Most of the sewage treatment facilities are located along the lake and sludge is sent to dumps and to other facilities in the province:

 Ashbridge's Bay Waste Treatment Plant
 Humber Bay Waste Treatment Plant
 North Toronto Waste Treatment Plant
 Highland Creek Waste Treatment Plant
 Dee Avenue Laboratory

Public works projects initiated by the city involves items like repairing sewers, water networks, and maintaining city facilities.

There are approximately 1600 storm sewers that drain rainwater to creeks in rivers in the city. Accidental runoff from sanitary sewers have led to severe pollution in a number of water ways.

Critical waterways used to drain water in the city include:

 Humber River
 Don River
 Highland Creek
 Taylor-Massey Creek
 Etobicoke Creek
 Black Creek

Solid Waste Management
The city's Solid Waste Management is responsible for picking up garbage and recycling in the city. Most of the services are public with Etobicoke contracted out due to previously signed by the former City of Etobicoke:

Garbage transfer stations
 Bermondsey transfer station
 Commissioner Street transfer station
 Disco transfer station
 Dufferin transfer station
 Ingram transfer station
 Scarborough transfer station
 Victoria Park transfer station

Public Works yards
 Booth
 Disco transfer station
 Ellesmere Yard
 Etobicoke Civic Centre
 Ingram transfer station
 King Street
 Central
 Bermondsey transfer station
 Scarborough transfer station
 Yonge Street

The city once owned landfills in the Greater Toronto Area, but solid waste is now shipped to a landfill the city bought near St. Thomas, Ontario and another facility in Michigan. A list of some of the dumps being used or that were used in past:

 Carleton Farms - Carelton, Michigan
 Green Lane - Southwold, Ontario
 Brock Road in Pickering - closed
 Keele Valley Landfill in Vaughan - closed
 Islington and Finch - closed
 Beare Road - closed

A list of waste management programs applied in Toronto:

 Recycling System
 Blue Box
 Green Bin
 Composting
 Grey Box

Snow Removal
Toronto has budget money and resources for salting and plowing city roads in winter. There are 600 snowplows and 300 sidewalk snow removal equipment run by 1300 personnel.

Fleet
 Sterling Trucks Accetra heavy duty trucks
 Peterbilt 357 dump trucks
 Mack Trucks/Ford road sweepers
 Heil Environmental Industries Limited Formula 7000 Square Body side loader garbage trucks
 Allianz Series 3000 street sweepers
 Ride on street vacuums
 Crane Carrier Corporation side loaders were part of the City of North York's fleet prior to merger of the waste departments in 1998
 Ford F-series pickup trucks

Reorganization
The current structure is as follows:

 Toronto Technical Services Division - environmental, emergency and engineering
 Toronto Support Services Division - planning, financing and administration

Toronto Water is a new body responsible for water and sewage treatment in the city.

The department was formed the merger of the public works departments of each of the municipalities and with Metro Toronto Works Department).

Municipal government of Toronto
City of Toronto departments